KTYR (89.7 FM) is a radio station licensed to Trinity, Texas. The station broadcasts a Spanish Religious format and is owned by Aleluya Broadcasting Network.

References

External links
KTYR's official website

TYR
Trinity County, Texas